Brenthia catenata is a species of moth of the family Choreutidae. It was described by Edward Meyrick in 1907. It is found in India, Sri Lanka, the Philippines and Samoa.

The larvae feed on Erythrina species.

References

Brenthia
Moths described in 1907
Moths of Asia